Inya may refer to:

 Inya (river), a tributary of the Ob in Russia
 Inya (Sea of Okhotsk), a river in the Magadan Region
 Inya (rural locality), a village in Altai Republic, Russia
 Inya Lake, a lake in Yangon, Myanmar
 Inya, Ngazun, a village in Ngazun Township, Mandalay Region, Myanmar
 Inya, Tada-U, a village in Tada-U Township, Mandalay Region, Myanmar
 Inya, Pyay, a village in Pyay Township, Bago Region, Myanmar
 Inya, another name for the Burmese author Nu Nu Yi